Chrysothemis melittifolia is a species of plant in the family Gesneriaceae. It is endemic to Grenada, where it grows to 30 cm in height, with leaves 1–8 cm long and flowers reddish-pink or purple.

This plant was previously classified under several genera, including as Episcia melittifolia and Nautilocalyx melittifolius, before being reclassified as Chrysothemis melittifolia.

References

 The Gesneriad Reference Web entry

Gesnerioideae
Endemic flora of Grenada